Ashton with Stodday is a former township and civil parish near Lancaster, Lancashire, England.

The civil parish was created in 1866 within Lancaster Rural District. The hamlet of Stodday was transferred to Lancaster civil parish and borough in 1935. The parish was abolished and incorporated into Thurnham in 1980. The population was recorded as 191 in 1871, 173 in 1931, and 87 in 1961. The parish was bordered on the north by the parish of Aldcliffe, on the west by the River Lune and on the south by the River Conder, and included the hamlets of Stodday and Conder Green and the estate of Ashton Hall.

References

External links

Former civil parishes in Lancashire
Geography of the City of Lancaster